The epithet the Chaste may refer to:

 Alfonso II of Aragon (1157–1196), King of Aragon and Count of Barcelona
 Alfonso II of Asturias (759–842), King of Asturias
 Bolesław V the Chaste (1226–1279), Duke of Sandomierz in Lesser Poland and High Duke of Poland
 Fatimah (615–632), called al-Batūl (the Chaste), daughter of Muhammad
 Henry, King of Portugal (1512–1580), also a Catholic cardinal
 Laila bint Lukaiz (died 483), Arab poet

Lists of people by epithet